Chapter VI of the Constitution of Australia pertains to the admission of new states, alteration of the limits of existing states, and the governance of the territories. Since Federation, no new states have been admitted, although several territories have been admitted to the Commonwealth.

There are four sections within this chapter, they are:
 Section 121: New States may be admitted or established
 Section 122: Government of territories
 Section 123: Alteration of limits of States
 Section 124: Formation of new States

Reference list

Australian constitutional law